Küchwald stands for:
 a park and forest in Chemnitz, see Küchwald-Park
 a freight station in Chemnitz, see Küchwald railway station
 the Parkeisenbahn Chemnitz, also called "Parkeisenbahn Küchwald"
 a station of the Parkeisenbahn, actually Küchwaldwiese